Josh Janniere (born November 4, 1992) is a Canadian soccer player who most recently played for Colorado Rapids in Major League Soccer.

Career

Youth
Janniere grew up in Oakville. While playing for club team Clarkson SC, Janniere was player of the tournament at the Scotland International. He was scouted by various club teams including Tottenham Hotspur & Blackburn Rovers   of the English Premier League. He then joined the Toronto FC Youth Academy when he was 15, after playing for the Ontario provincial team. He played three seasons with the Senior Youth Academy side, including playing for TFC Academy in the Canadian Soccer League in 2010, and went on trial with the TFC first team during the 2010 preseason at the age of 17.

Professional
Janniere signed his first professional contract on March 30, 2011, when he was acquired by the Colorado Rapids from Toronto FC in exchange for a 2013 MLS Supplemental Draft pick.

He made his professional debut later the same day, in a Lamar Hunt U.S. Open Cup game against Chicago Fire.

Janniere was released by Colorado on May 7, 2012 and subsequently rejoined the TFC Academy, appearing for the first team in their friendly against Liverpool on July 21, 2012.

On November 22, 2012, Janniere went on trial with Sunderland of the English Premier League. It was announced on December 23, 2012 that Janniere would not be signing for the club due to work permit restrictions.

Career Stats

References

External links
 

1992 births
Living people
Black Canadian soccer players
Canadian soccer players
Canadian expatriate soccer players
Canadian Soccer League (1998–present) players
Canadian expatriate sportspeople in the United States
Colorado Rapids players
Soccer players from Hamilton, Ontario
Toronto FC players
Association football midfielders
Homegrown Players (MLS)